RCM may refer to:

Organisations

United Kingdom
 Royal College of Music, London
 Royal College of Midwives
 Royal Cornwall Museum

Canada
 Royal Canadian Mint
 The Royal Conservatory of Music
 Rassemblement des citoyens et des citoyennes de Montréal (Montreal Citizens' Movement), a former municipal political party in Montreal, Quebec

Science and technology
 Reliability-centered maintenance, a maintenance planning approach based on reliability and safety system assessment 
 Reciprocating Chemical Muscle, a mechanism that takes advantage of the superior energy density of chemical reactions
 Resonant Clock Mesh, technology used in the AMD Piledriver (microarchitecture)
 Restrictive cardiomyopathy
 Revenue cycle management, the process used by healthcare systems in the United States to track revenue from patients
 Reverse Cuthill–McKee algorithm, an algorithm to reduce the bandwidth of sparse symmetric matrices
 Ring-closing metathesis, a variation on olefin metathesis
 Rotor current meter, a mechanical current meter used in oceanography
 RADARSAT Constellation Mission, three-spacecraft fleet of Earth observation satellites operated by the Canadian Space Agency
 Reflection Contrast Microscopy, or Interference reflection microscopy, a type of optical microscopy
 Regulatory Compliance Mark, an Australian conformity mark

Other uses
 Rapid Communications in Mass Spectrometry, a scientific journal
 Regimental Corporal Major, a warrant officer appointment in the British Household Cavalry
 Regional county municipality, a territorial subdivision of Quebec
 RCM, IATA code for Richmond Airport, Australia
 Refugee Children's Movement, the organization which carried out the Kindertransport of children from Nazi Germany